Among the repertoire for the standard string sextet (2 violins, 2 violas, and 2 cellos) are the following works:

Ordering is by surname of composer.

Afanasyev, Nikolai
 String Sextet

Barvinsky, Vassily
 String Sextet (1914)

Bečan, Nejc (1984)
 Clownology (The Jester, Pierrot - the sad Clown, The Circus Clown)

Berezovsky, Nikolai
 String Sextet No. 1
 String Sextet No. 2

Boccherini, Luigi
 6 String Sextets, Op. 23 (1776)

Borodin, Aleksandr
 String Sextet in D minor

Børresen, Hakon
 String Sextet in G major, Op. 5 (1901)

Brahms, Johannes
 String Sextet No. 1 in B-flat major, Op. 18 (1860) 
 String Sextet No. 2 in G major, Op. 36 (1864-1865)

Bridge, Frank
 String sextet in E-flat major (1906-1913)

Busch, Adolf
 String Sextet

Cissell, Luke
 String Sextet No. 1 (2019)
 String Sextet No. 2 (2019)

Davidov, Alexei
 String Sextet in E-flat major Op.12

Davydov, Karl
 String Sextet Op.35 (1879)

Dohnányi, Ernst von
 String Sextet W080 (1893/6/8)

Antonín Dvořák
 String Sextet A major, Op. 48, (B. 80) (1878)

Gade, Niels
 String Sextet in E-flat major, Op. 35

Geviksman, Vitali
 String Sextet (1960)

Glass, Louis
 String Sextet, Op.15

Glière, Reinhold
 String Sextet No. 1, Op. 1 (1900)
 String Sextet No. 2, Op. 7 (1902)
 String Sextet No. 3, Op. 11 (1904)

Hofmann, Heinrich
 String Sextet in E minor, Op. 25 (published 1874)

Holbrooke, Joseph
 String Sextet "Henry Vaughan" in D major, Op. 43/16 (1902)

Indy, Vincent d'
 Sextet for Strings in B-flat major, Op. 92

Kapp, Artur
 String Sextet (1951)

Koechlin, Charles
 Le portrait de Daisy Hamilton, Op. 140

Koessler, Hans
 String Sextet in F minor (published 1902)

Korndorf, Nikolai
 Mozart Variations for string sextet (1990)

Korngold, Erich
 String Sextet in D, Op. 10

Ledenev, Roman
 Elegiac Sextet for strings Op. 30 (1982)

Lewandowsky, Max
 String Sextet in C minor, Op. 5

Martinu, Bohuslav
 String Sextet H. 224 (1932)

Merikanto, Aarre
 String Sextet (1932) (reconstructed by Paavo Heininen, 1993)

Mosonyi, Mihály 
 String Sextet in C minor

Mozart, Wolfgang Amadeus (sort-of):
 Grande Sestetto Concertante (1808 transcription of the Sinfonia Concertante for violin, viola and orchestra)

Penderecki, Krzysztof
 Ciaccona in memoriam Giovanni Paolo II (Ludwig) (2005)

Piston, Walter
 String Sextet

Rääts, Jaan
 String Sextet, Op. 98 (1997)

Raff, Joachim
 String Sextet in G minor, Op. 178 (1872)

Reger, Max
 String Sextet in F major, Op. 118

Rimsky-Korsakov, Nikolai
 String sextet in A major (1876])

Rubinstein, Anton
 Sextet for strings in D major Op. 97 (1876)

Schoenberg, Arnold
 Verklärte Nacht (Transfigured Night), Op. 4 (1899)

Schulhoff, Erwin
 Sextet for strings, (1920-24)

Spohr, Ludwig
 String Sextet in C major, Op. 140 (1848)
 

 String Sextet in G major, Op. 20

Stanchinsky, Aleksei
 Sextet for strings

Strauss, Richard
 Sextet for strings from the opera Capriccio

Tchaikovsky, Pyotr
 Souvenir de Florence for string sextet, Op. 70 (1890)

Vasks, Pēteris
 Spring Sonata for string sextet (1987)

Waterhouse, Graham
 String Sextet, Op. 1 (1979/2013)

Wilm, Nikolai von
 String Sextet Op. 27

Wuorinen, Charles
 String Sextet (1989)

References

IMSLP category for string sextets for the usual lineup

See also
 List of triple concertos for violin, cello, and piano
 String instrument repertoire
 List of solo cello pieces
 List of compositions for cello and piano
 List of compositions for cello and orchestra
 List of double concertos for violin and cello